Oleksandr Heorhiovych Rolevych (born 16 March 1965 in Odessa) is a former Ukrainian football player.

References

1965 births
Footballers from Odesa
Living people
Soviet footballers
SC Odesa players
FC Zimbru Chișinău players
FC Shakhtar Donetsk players
Ukrainian footballers
Ukrainian Premier League players
FC Kryvbas Kryvyi Rih players
NK Veres Rivne players
FC Temp Shepetivka players
FC Baltika Kaliningrad players
Ukrainian expatriate footballers
Expatriate footballers in Russia
Russian Premier League players
FC Kuban Krasnodar players
FC Shakhter Karagandy players
Expatriate footballers in Kazakhstan
Association football defenders
FC Nosta Novotroitsk players